Lyman Royal Sherman (22 May 1804 – January or February 1839) was an early leader in the Latter Day Saint movement, an inaugural member of the Seven Presidents of the Seventy, and was called to the Quorum of the Twelve Apostles but died before being informed and ordained.

Biography
Sherman was born in Monkton, Vermont to Elkanah Sherman and Asenath Hulbert. In 1832, he joined the Church of Jesus Christ of Latter-Day Saints and in 1834 was part of Zion's Camp.

On January 16, 1839, Joseph Smith, along with Sidney Rigdon and Hyrum Smith, wrote Brigham Young and Heber C. Kimball to call Sherman and George A. Smith to replace Thomas B. Marsh and Orson Hyde, respectively, in the Quorum of the Twelve. The next month, on February 23, Kimball noted that George A. Smith was indeed added to the quorum, but Sherman died shortly after Joseph Smith wrote the letter. Kimball concluded that it was not the will of God for a man to take Hyde's place in the quorum.

On the west side of the Latter Day Saints' temple in Kirtland stood a printing office. Enemies of the church were planning to use the printing press in a scheme against Joseph Smith. Sherman heard of the plot, and burned the printing press before it could happen. Winds saved the temple from catching fire.

A section of the Doctrine and Covenants is a revelation received by Smith in response to a query from Sherman about the Lord's will for him.

Sherman died in January or February 1839, in Far West, Missouri. His widow, Delcena Didamia Johnson, married Joseph Smith by July 1842.

Footnotes 

1804 births
1839 deaths
American Latter Day Saints
Converts to Mormonism
Date of death unknown
Doctrine and Covenants people
Leaders in the Church of Christ (Latter Day Saints)
People from Monkton, Vermont
Presidents of the Seventy (LDS Church)
Religious leaders from Vermont